Wallington railway station is in the London Borough of Sutton in south London. The station, and all trains serving it, is operated by Southern, and is in Travelcard Zone 5.

The station was opened on 10 May 1847 by the London, Brighton and South Coast Railway as 'Carshalton' on the new Croydon to Epsom railway and was renamed to 'Wallington' in 1868 when the new Carshalton railway station opened in Carshalton village. During 2009 some renovations to the station were undertaken, including platform raising.

Ticket barriers are in operation at this station.

Services
All services at Wallington are operated by Southern using  EMUs.

The typical off-peak service in trains per hour is:
 2 tph to  via 
 2 tph to 
 2 tph to 

Connections
London Buses routes 127, 151, 157, 410, 463, S4, and 455, school routes 612 (Non TFL) and 627 serve the station.  Northbound journeys serve bus stops in the Station Approach road.  Most southbound journeys stop on Manor Road opposite the entrance to Station Approach.

External links 

 Photographs of Wallington station

References

Railway stations in the London Borough of Sutton
Former London, Brighton and South Coast Railway stations
Railway stations in Great Britain opened in 1847
Railway stations served by Govia Thameslink Railway
1847 establishments in England